Wichan Sakiya, born October 10, 1977 is a retired Thai footballer. Sakiya won the Kor Royal Cup with Krung Thai Bank FC in the 2002-03 and 2003-04 seasons of the Thai Premier League.

References

1977 births
Living people
Wichan Sakiya
Association football forwards
Wichan Sakiya
Wichan Sakiya